Mustakone is a tricylic sesquiterpenoid with the chemical formula C15H22O. It is named after the plant it was first extracted from Cyperus rotundus, which had the common name "mustuka" in Hindi. Mustakone can be found in a variety of plants and their oils like Myrcia sylvatica, Cyperus articulatus, and Hymenaea courbaril.

Reference 

Tricyclic compounds
Ketones
Sesquiterpenes